The anterior raphespinal tract is a tract in the spinal cord in the anterior funiculus.

References 

Spinal cord